Dale Street Warehouse is an early nineteenth century warehouse in the Piccadilly Basin area of Manchester city centre. It is a Grade II* listed building as of 10 November 1972. It is the earliest surviving canal warehouse in the city. The building is dated 1806 with initials "WC" on the datestone indicating that it was designed by William Crosley, an engineer who worked with William Jessop on the inner-Manchester canal system.

Constructed of watershot millstone grit blocks, the four-storey building has timber floors, supported throughout by cast-iron columns, a feature which now makes it unique amongst Manchester warehouses. The base of the building incorporates four boatholes which allowed boats to unload their cargoes inside of the warehouse. The warehouse also incorporates a "subterranean wheel-pit containing a 16-foot water-wheel used to drive hoists both in this building and in a former warehouse to the south via a line-shaft tunnel which mostly survives beneath the car-park."

For many years the building was a shop and was described in 2000 as "sadly neglected"; the warehouse has now been converted to office space and a café and renamed Carver's Warehouse.

See also

Listed buildings in Manchester-M1

Notes

References 
 Pevsner, Nikolaus; Hartwell, Clare & Hyde, Matthew, The Buildings of England: Lancashire - Manchester and the South East (2004) Yale University Press
 Hartwell, Claire Pevsner Architectural Guides: Manchester (2001) Yale University Press

Commercial buildings in Manchester
Warehouses in England
Grade II* listed buildings in Manchester
Grade II* listed commercial buildings
Grade II* listed industrial buildings